The Black Hours now in the collection of the Hispanic Society of America museum in New York City is a black book of hours made around 1458.

The calendar is appropriate for the Crown of Aragon, and it has been suggested it was a gift, on her bereavement, to Maria of Castile, queen of Alfonso V of Aragon who died in Valencia in 1458.  The black vellum and her coat of arms, no longer blazoned with that of Aragon support this theory.  The illuminator was Flemish, perhaps working in Spain at the time.

Description
The book is an illuminated manuscript on black parchment, consisting of 152 folios, each measuring about 14.7 x 10.1 cm.  The text is a version of the usual book of hours text, formally the Horae Beatae Marie Secundum usum curie romane (Hours of the Blessed Mary Following the Use of Rome). 

The manuscript has space on the page facing the start of each office, for a miniature.  The inclusion of St. Vincent Ferrer, who was canonized in 1455, gives us a terminus post quem.  Folio 13r bears the coat of arms of Castile (believed to be that of Maria of Castile).

See also
 Purple parchment

References

Black books of hours
15th-century illuminated manuscripts